Jörg Madlener (1939 in Düsseldorf, Germany) is a German painter, engraver and stage designer.

Early life and education 
Jörg Madlener was born on September 8, 1939 in Düsseldorf, Germany. His father, Max Madlener, was a surgeon and disciple of Ferdinand Sauerbruch with whom he worked at the Charité Hospital in Berlin. His mother, Hildegard Pape, was an interior designer. After receiving his undergraduate diploma in architecture in Darmstadt he continued his studies in 1960 at the Städelschule in Frankfurt where he studied under professor Heinz Battke. Afternoons he was auditor at lectures and seminars by Theodor Adorno and Max Horkheimer at the Johann Wolfgang Goethe University in Frankfurt.

In 1963 he was private student of Otto Dix in Hemmenhofen at the lake of Constance. Otto Dix taught Jörg Madlener the technique of egg-oil tempera and working with glazing.

In 1964 Jörg Madlener moved to Belgium and continued studying art at the Royal Institute of Fine Arts in Antwerp under Jos Hendrickx.

Work 
Jörg Madlener's first solo exhibition in 1965 at the Galerie Le Creuset in Brussels displayed a group of paintings, which were strongly influenced by the work of German painter Max Beckmann.

Starting in 1975 Madlener's work was bound to large themes that he followed over years, inspired by Robert Musil, Death in Venice (Thomas Mann and Luchino Visconti), Gustav Mahler's The Song of the Earth, Jackson Pollock.

Madlener's 32 portraits of Gustav Mahler are made with a wide range of visual vocabulary from a single photograph of the composer Gustav Mahler.

His works can be found at museums around the globe including the Solomon R. Guggenheim Museum in New York, the Albertina in Vienna, the Museum of Modern Art in Brussels and the Bayerische Staatsgemäldesammlung in Munich. Public and private collections in Belgium, Luxembourg, Switzerland, the Netherlands, France, Spain, Italy, Germany, the United States and the United Arab Emirates own his paintings.

In 2019 and 2020, his recent works about the Civil War in Syria and other war-related series will be shown at the former Royal Stables (now belonging to Royal Academies for Science and the Arts of Belgium) in Brussels, at the Energy Park Saerbeck, Germany (in a remodeled bunker of the Cold War) and in Worms, Germany.

Stage design 
Jörg Madlener worked with many world-renowned theatre stages as a stage and set designer. He worked on following plays:

 1986 Den Haag, Haagse Comedie, Don Juan, by Molière 
 1986 Bruxelles, Théâtre National de Belgique, Les Fourberies de Scapin, by Molière 
 1977 Saarbrücken, National Sarreland Théâtre, A Midsummer Night Dream, by Shakespeare 
 1964 Bruxelles, Théâtre de l'Alliance, La Ballade du Grand Macabre, by Michel de Chelderode 
 1961 Frankfurt am Main, Neue Bühne at Frankfurt University, The New Mendoza, by J.M. Lenz and Mystero Buffo

Exhibitions 
Notable solo exhibitions include

 2016 Liquid Art House, Boston
 2015 ICCC Woodbourne New York
 2010 Residenz Kepmpten, Germany
 2010 Transit Gallery, Mechelen, Belgium
 1985 Philippe Guimiot Gallery Brussels 
 1985 Esibeth Franck Gallery, kkonookke - le Zout, Belgium
 1982 Palais des Beaux-Arts, Bruxelles
 1981 B.P.I. Centre Pompidou, Paris
 1978 Kunsthalle, Darmstadt
 1977 Saarlandmuseum, Moderne Galerie
 1973 Oldenburg Museum
 1973 Musée des Beaux-Arts, Charleroi
 1972 Museum D'hondt Dhaenens, Gent

Madlener participated in several international biennales

 1983 Biennale Sao Paolo, Brazil, Belgian Pavilion
 1981 Biennale Venice, Belgian pavilion, Death in Venice 
 1981 Sofia Triennale
 1972 Venice Biennale, Grafica Oggi
 1971 International Engraving Biennale, Ljubljana, Jugoslawien  
 1965 International Engraving Biennale, Ljubljana, Jugoslawien

References

Future reading 

 Jörg Madlener ; Kassandra, Herausgeber Joch, Peter, London ; Blurb ; 2010 
 Gesichtslos: die Malerei des Diffusen; Eugène Carrière, John Beard, Jörg Madlener, Joe Allen, Rainer Lind, 2009
 Ausgewählt! : Neuerwerbungen aus der Graphischen Sammlung 2000 bis 2005 ; [anlässlich der Ausstellung Ausgewählt! Neuerwerbungen aus der Graphischen Sammlung 2000 bis 2005, 9. März - 4. Juni 2006] / Graphische Sammlung, Hessisches Landesmuseum Darmstadt, 2006
 Jörg Madlener - paintings, New York, 1999
 Jörg Madlener, Grenzüberschreitungen: Variationen zu Gustav Mahler u. Thomas Mann ; e. Ausstellung d. Bad. Landesbibliothek / mit e. Einf. von Christel Römer. In Zusammenarbeit mit d. Galerie Paepcke, 1986
 Jörg Madlener - The mountain and the woodman’s hut, Brussels : Philippe Guimiot Art Gallery, 1986
 Jörg Madlener ; [le chant de la terre ; peintures 1983 - 1984, d'après la symphonie de Lieder de Gustav Mahler et les poèmes de Wang-Wei, Li-Tai-Po, Tchang-Tsi, Mong-Kao-Yen] ; Paris, Grand Palais FIAC, 84, [20 - 28 octobre], Madrid, Palacio de Cristal, Arco 85, 1984 
 Der Tod in Venedig: Hommage à Thomas Mann et Luchino Visconti ; Zeichn., Aquarelle u. Gemälde von Jörg Madlener, Jan Vanriet ; Kunsthalle am Steubenplatz, 24.9. - 29.10.1978 / Kunstverein Darmstadt, 1978

20th-century German artists
Artists from Düsseldorf
1939 births
Living people